Robert J. Stephenson (born May 18, 1967) is an American film and television actor, film producer and screenwriter who is probably best known as Sheriff Jimmy Taylor on the CBS TV series Jericho.

Life
Stephenson was born in Oxnard, California. He attended college at University of California at Santa Barbara. He starred as a lazy man in the video for the song, "Lazy" by English music group X-Press 2 sung by the American singer David Byrne of Talking Heads, which reached number 2 in the United Kingdom, number 1 on the U.S. Dance Charts and number 1 in Syria in 2002. Along with fellow actor and good friend Tom Hanks he shares a love of the English Premier League team Aston Villa.

Filmography

Actor

Producer 
The Dangerous Lives of Altar Boys (2002)
Thumbsucker (2005)

Screenwriter 
Southlander (2001)

References

External links

1967 births
20th-century American male actors
21st-century American male actors
American male film actors
Film producers from California
American male screenwriters
American male television actors
American male voice actors
Living people
Male actors from Oxnard, California
Screenwriters from California